4th ZAI Awards

Presenter Union of Authors and Performers 

Broadcaster STV 

Grand Prix Ján Lehotský

◄ 3rd │ 5th ►

The 4th ZAI Awards, honoring the best in the Slovak music industry for individual achievements for the year of 1993, took time and place in February 1994 in Bratislava.

Winners

Main categories

Others

References

External links
 ZAI Awards > Winners (Official site)
 ZAI Awards > 1993 Winners (at SME)

04
Zai Awards
1993 music awards